Consort Tong may refer to:

Empress Xiaokangzhang (1640–1663), original surname Tong, concubine of the Shunzhi Emperor
Thừa Thiên (empress) (1762–1814), surname Tống, wife of the Gia Long Emperor
Noble Consort Tong (1817–1877), concubine of the Daoguang Emperor